The Capricorn Way is an Australian road route from Rockhampton to Barcaldine in Queensland. The recommended journey time, allowing for some sightseeing, food and rest (including an overnight stop) is 30 hours. It has been designated by the Queensland Government as a State Strategic Touring Route.

The route 
The entire route is via the Capricorn Highway from:
 Rockhampton to Duaringa
 Duaringa to Blackwater
 Blackwater to Emerald
 Emerald to The Gemfields
 The Gemfields to Alpha
 Alpha to Barcaldine

References 

State Strategic Touring Routes in Queensland